Rayappanur is a village in Kallakurichi district, Tamil Nadu, India.

Location
Post        : Melnariyappanur
Taluk      : Chinnasalem
pin code : 606201

Villages in Kallakurichi district